Charles King Francis (3 February 1851 – 28 October 1925) was an English first-class cricketer active 1870–79 who played for Middlesex. He was born in Upminster; died in Crichel, Dorset. His brother Arthur was also a cricketer.

Francis was educated at Rugby School and Brasenose College, Oxford. After graduating he became a barrister and practised in London and south-east England. He was a stipendiary magistrate (now called a district judge) from 1896.

References

1851 births
1925 deaths
People from Upminster
Sportspeople from Essex
English cricketers
Middlesex cricketers
Oxford University cricketers
People educated at Rugby School
Alumni of Brasenose College, Oxford
English barristers
Marylebone Cricket Club cricketers
Gentlemen of England cricketers
I Zingari cricketers
Gentlemen cricketers
North v South cricketers
Gentlemen of the South cricketers
Stipendiary magistrates (England and Wales)